Blake Andrew Hance (born January 11, 1996) is an American football guard for the Jacksonville Jaguars of the National Football League (NFL). He played college football at Northwestern.

Professional career

Buffalo Bills
After playing four years at Northwestern, Hance was signed by the Buffalo Bills as an undrafted free agent on May 9, 2019. However, he was soon released on May 22.

Washington Football Team
On June 3, 2019, Hance was signed by the Washington Football Team, where he spent the rest of training camp, being waived on August 31.

Jacksonville Jaguars
On September 1, 2019, Hance was signed by the Jacksonville Jaguars to their practice squad, where he spent the entire 2019 season. Afterward, he was signed to a reserve/futures contract on January 2, 2020, but was waived on September 5.

New York Jets
On September 22, 2020, Hance was signed by the New York Jets to their practice squad.

Cleveland Browns
On January 2, 2021, Hance was signed by the Cleveland Browns from the Jets' practice squad. Because of injuries and players inactive due to positive COVID-19 tests, he was activated for the Browns' playoff game against the Pittsburgh Steelers. He made his NFL debut in the fourth quarter, playing 14 snaps. Browns quarterback Baker Mayfield complimented Hance while noting they had not had a chance to practice together. "We had Michael Dunn step in at left guard for Joel Bitonio. And then, Michael got hurt and a guy named Blake, that I introduced myself to literally in the locker room before the game, stepped up in the fourth quarter."

The Browns placed an exclusive-rights free agent tender on Hance on March 7, 2022. Hance was waived by the Browns on August 30, 2022.

San Francisco 49ers
On August 31, 2022, Hance was claimed off waivers by the San Francisco 49ers. He was waived on October 29.

Jacksonville Jaguars (second stint)
On November 1, 2022, Hance was claimed off waivers by the Jacksonville Jaguars.

References

External links
Jacksonville Jaguars bio
Northwestern Wildcats bio

1996 births
Living people
American football offensive guards
American football offensive tackles
Buffalo Bills players
Cleveland Browns players
Jacksonville Jaguars players
New York Jets players
Northwestern Wildcats football players
People from Jacksonville, Illinois
Players of American football from Illinois
San Francisco 49ers players
Washington Redskins players